Parfait Mandanda (born 10 October 1989) is a Congolese professional footballer who plays as a goalkeeper. Born in France, he represented DR Congo at international level.

Club career
Born in Nevers, Mandanda began his career at Stade Malherbe Caen, moving in 2001 to French Ligue 1 club Bordeaux in the youth system. He graduated to the first team in 2008. He was loaned out to AS Beauvais from Bordeaux in January 2009 for the rest of the season, and in July 2009, Beauvais took up the option to make Madanda's move permanent. in 2010 he moved to Altay S.K., then playing in Turkish second division TFF First League.

Charleroi
Mandanda signed with Belgian Pro League club Sporting Charleroi in 2011. In February 2019, he joined Dinamo București on loan.

Hartford
Charleroi loaned Mandanda to USL Championship club Hartford Athletic for the 2020 season. In his first game with the club he recorded a shutout and an assist in the team's 1–0 win over New York Red Bulls II and was named man of the match.

Mouscron
On 20 July 2021, he joined Mouscron for a one-year term with an option for the second year.

International career
Mandanda was named in the Congo DR squad against France B on 5 February 2008. Mandanda only played in the second half but missed out on a place in the history books as his older brother Steve Mandanda, also a goalkeeper and currently at Olympique de Marseille, only played in the first half for France.

Officially, he gained his first cap for DR Congo national football team against Gabon on 25 March 2008.

Personal life
Parfait is the younger brother of French international and Marseille goalkeeper Steve Mandanda, and has two younger brothers. They are all goalkeepers: Riffi and Over Mandanda.

Honours
DR Congo
Africa Cup of Nations bronze: 2015

References

External links
 
 
 
 

1989 births
People from Nevers
French sportspeople of Democratic Republic of the Congo descent
Living people
Sportspeople from Nièvre
Footballers from Bourgogne-Franche-Comté
French footballers
France under-21 international footballers
Democratic Republic of the Congo footballers
Democratic Republic of the Congo international footballers
Association football goalkeepers
FC Girondins de Bordeaux players
AS Beauvais Oise players
Altay S.K. footballers
R. Charleroi S.C. players
FC Dinamo București players
Hartford Athletic players
Royal Excel Mouscron players
TFF First League players
Belgian Pro League players
Challenger Pro League players
Liga I players
USL Championship players
2013 Africa Cup of Nations players
2015 Africa Cup of Nations players
2019 Africa Cup of Nations players
Democratic Republic of the Congo expatriate footballers
French expatriate footballers
Expatriate footballers in Turkey
Democratic Republic of the Congo expatriate sportspeople in Turkey
Expatriate footballers in Belgium
Democratic Republic of the Congo expatriate sportspeople in Belgium
Expatriate footballers in Romania
Democratic Republic of the Congo expatriate sportspeople in Romania
Expatriate soccer players in the United States
Democratic Republic of the Congo expatriate sportspeople in the United States
French expatriate sportspeople in Turkey
French expatriate sportspeople in Belgium
French expatriate sportspeople in Romania
French expatriate sportspeople in the United States
Black French sportspeople
Footballers from Normandy